Anna Maria Siega-Riz is an American nutrition, maternal and child health scientist and academic administrator. She is dean of the University of Massachusetts Amherst School of Public Health and Health Sciences. Siega-Riz was previously associate dean for research and the Jeanette Lancaster Alumni Professor of Nursing at University of Virginia School of Nursing.

Education 
Anna Maria Siega-Riz completed a Bachelors of Science in Public Health with a major in nutrition at UNC Gillings School of Global Public Health in 1982. She earned a Master of Science in Food, Nutrition, and Food Service Management from University of North Carolina at Greensboro in 1983. She obtained a Doctor of Philosophy in nutrition with a minor in epidemiology from Gillings School of Global Public Health in 1993. From 1994 to 1995, Siega-Riz completed postdoctoral research at the Carolina Population Center.

Career 
Siega-Riz joined the faculty at the UNC Gillings School of Global Public Health as a research assistant professor in 1995. She became the associate dean for academic affairs and led the Reproductive, Perinatal, and Pediatric Program in the Department of Epidemiology. Siega-Riz is the associate dean for research and the Jeanette Lancaster Alumni Professor of Nursing at University of Virginia School of Nursing.

She served on the Dietary Guidelines Federal Advisory Committee from 2013 to 2015. She also served on the advisory council of the National Heart, Lung, and Blood Institute.

She was a registered dietitian from 1983 to 2014. She speaks English and Spanish.

In 2019, she became a dean of the University of Massachusetts Amherst School of Public Health and Health Sciences.

References

External links 

 

Year of birth missing (living people)
Living people
UNC Gillings School of Global Public Health alumni
University of North Carolina at Chapel Hill faculty
University of North Carolina at Greensboro alumni
University of Virginia faculty
20th-century American scientists
21st-century American scientists
20th-century American women scientists
21st-century American women scientists
Dietitians
American women nutritionists
American nutritionists
University of Massachusetts Amherst faculty
American women academics